Sromowce may refer to the adjacent villages of:

 Sromowce Wyżne, Gmina Czorsztyn, Lesser Poland Voivodeship, southern Poland 
 Sromowce Niżne, Gmina Czorsztyn, Lesser Poland Voivodeship, southern Poland